Justyn Ross (born December 15, 1999) is an American football wide receiver for the Kansas City Chiefs of the National Football League (NFL). He played college football at Clemson.

Early years
Ross attended Central High School in Phenix City, Alabama. As a senior, he had 37 receptions for 730 yards and 13 touchdowns. Ross was a four-star recruit ranked as the number 45 national recruit and the number 7 wide receiver in the nation receiving offers from several Division I colleges such as Alabama, Clemson, Auburn, and Duke. He committed to Clemson University to play college football.

College career
As a freshman at Clemson in 2018, Ross had 46 receptions for 1,000 yards and nine touchdowns. In the 2019 College Football Playoff National Championship against Alabama he had six receptions for 153 yards and a touchdown. As a sophomore in 2019, Ross finished with 865 receiving yards on 66 receptions with eight touchdowns. Ross missed the entire 2020 season due to a congenital fusion condition of his neck and spine that required surgery. He was granted a medical redshirt after his surgery. As a redshirt junior in 2021, Ross finished with a team high of 524 receiving yards on 47 receptions and three touchdowns in ten games. Ross finished his career at Clemson ranking 5th all-time in career receiving touchdowns with 20. On January 6, 2022, Ross announced that he would forgo his senior year, and enter the NFL Draft.

Statistics

Professional career

Ross was not selected during the 2022 NFL Draft. He signed with the Kansas City Chiefs as an undrafted free agent on May 7, 2022. On July 25, 2022, Ross was placed on injured reserve.

References

External links
 Kansas City Chiefs
 Clemson Tigers bio

1999 births
Living people
People from Phenix City, Alabama
Players of American football from Alabama
American football wide receivers
Clemson Tigers football players
Kansas City Chiefs players